The XPW Television Championship was introduced in 2001 by Xtreme Pro Wrestling and the champion was decided in a one night tournament at XPW's Damage Inc. event, which featured competitors such as Konnan, Johnny Webb, Kid Kaos, Dynamite D and Vic Grimes.

There would only be two XPW Television Champions, as Kaos held the championship for a year and a half. Kaos would go on to successfully defend the XPW Television Championship against the likes of Psicosis, Nosawa, Chris Hamrick, Danny Doring, Jonny Storm, and Shark Boy.

Damage Inc. Tournament

Title history
Key

See also
Xtreme Pro Wrestling

References
General
http://www.xpwonline.com/xpw-tv-title/
Specific

Xtreme Pro Wrestling championships
Television wrestling championships